Hong Kong became an international transportation hub of cargo and passengers soon after 1841.  In air transport, Hong Kong International Airport acts as a major international hubs for both passenger and cargo.  There are several airports and heliports for military and other civil purposes.  Helipads are commonly found in Hong Kong especially in large government buildings.

Flight Information Region (FIR)
The ICAO code of Hong Kong Flight Information Region (Hong Kong FIR) is VHHK.

Airports

Heliports

Helipads
According to Hong Kong Government's record, there are about 170 helicopter landing pads (helipads) in Hong Kong.

 Black Point Power Station, Lung Kwu Tan
 Black Point Radar Station, Lung Kwu Tan
 Castle Peak Power Station, Tap Shek Kok
 Cheung Chau, between Tung Wan Beach and Kwun Yam Beach
 Discovery Bay Marina
 Fei Ngo Shan, on top of Fei Ngo Shan
 Hau Tong Kai, Sai Kung
 Hei Ling Chau
 Island House, Tai Po
 Kadoorie Base, engineering and operations base of Heliservices (Hong Kong) Ltd, Lam Kam Road, New Territories
 Kadoorie Farm and Botanic Garden
 Kai Tak Hong Kong Aviation Club
 Deep Bay Link Helipad, Kong Sham Western Highway
 Kwai Chung Workshop, (Fire Services Department) at Lai King Hill Road
 Lamma Power Station, Lamma Island
 Lo Fu Kei Shek, Sai Kung
 Lung Kwu Chau
 Marine East Divisional Police Station, Sai Kung
 Mui Wo waterfront, Lantau Island
 Nam Long Shan (Brick Hill), near the top of the mountain, for maintenance of the radio towers
 Pamela Youde Nethersole Eastern Hospital, Chai Wan
 The Peninsula hotel, Tsim Sha Tsui
 Peng Chau
 Penny's Bay Power Station, Penny's Bay, Lantau
 Sai Wan, Sai Kung
 Sha Chau
 Shek Kwu Chau
 Siu Sai Wan, Siu Sai Wan Sports Ground
 Soko Islands, south of Lantau Island
 Strafford House, Tai Po Kau, owned by CLP Group
 Sunny Bay, in Hong Kong Disneyland Resort
 Tai Mei Tuk, near the main dam of the Plover Cove Reservoir
 Tai Po Industrial Estate, Tai Po
 Tap Mun, Tap Mun Playground
 Tsim Bei Tsui, near police post
 Tung Ping Chau
 Waglan Island
 Wan Chai, next to the Hong Kong Island exit of the Cross-Harbour Tunnel
 West Kowloon, next to the Kowloon exit of the Western Harbour Tunnel
 Yuen Long Police Station, Yuen Long

Former helipads
Central waterfront - moved to Wan Chai
 Queen Elizabeth Hospital, Kowloon – helipad was located on current site of Ambulatory Care Centre

See also
 Aviation history of Hong Kong
 Transport in Hong Kong

References

External links
List of heliports and helipads in Hong Kong (in Chinese)
GeoInfo Map (keywords: helicopter landing pad)
Other lists of airports in Hong Kong:
Great Circle Mapper
FallingRain.com
Aircraft Charter World
The Airport Guide

 
 
Airports
Hong Kong
Hong Kong